Hickory Ridge Township may refer to one of the following places in the United States:

Hickory Ridge Township, Cross County, Arkansas
Hickory Ridge Township, Phillips County, Arkansas
Hickory Ridge Township, Okfuskee County, Oklahoma

See also

 Hickory Township (disambiguation)

Township name disambiguation pages